The 2017 FIBA U16 European Championship was the 31st edition of the Under-16 European Basketball Championship. The tournament was held in Podgorica, Montenegro, from 11 to 19 August 2017. Sixteen (16) teams participated, including 2016 Division B top three finishers.

Hosts selection
On 21 November 2016, FIBA Europe announced during their Board Meeting held in Istanbul, Turkey that Montenegro will be the organising country for the tournament.

Participating teams

  (Runners-up, 2016 FIBA U16 European Championship Division B)

  (Winners, 2016 FIBA U16 European Championship Division B)

  (3rd place, 2016 FIBA U16 European Championship Division B)

First round
In this round, sixteen teams are allocated in four groups of four teams each. All teams advance to the Playoffs.

Group A

Group B

Group C

Group D

Final round

Bracket

5th–8th place bracket

9th–16th place bracket

13th–16th place bracket

Round of 16

9th–16th place quarterfinals

Quarterfinals

13th–16th place semifinals

9th–12th place semifinals

5th–8th place semifinals

Semifinals

15th place game

13th place game

Eleventh place game

Ninth place game

Seventh place game

Fifth place game

Bronze medal game

Final

Final standings

Awards

All-Tournament Team

  Killian Hayes
  Bojan Tomašević
  Stefan Vlahović
  Matej Rudan
  Đorđe Pažin

References

External links
Tournament statistics at FIBA Archive
FIBA official website

 
FIBA U16 European Championship
2017–18 in European basketball
2017–18 in Montenegrin basketball
International youth basketball competitions hosted by Montenegro
Sports competitions in Podgorica
August 2016 sports events in Europe